Pedro Henrique Müller Zin (born 12 April 2002), commonly known as Pedro Müller, is a Brazilian footballer who currently plays as a forward for Rio Branco-PR.

Career statistics

Club

Notes

References

2002 births
Living people
Brazilian footballers
Association football defenders
Rio Branco Sport Club players